Hoghton is a civil parish in the Borough of Chorley, Lancashire, England.  It contains 16 buildings that are recorded in the National Heritage List for England as designated listed buildings.   Of these, two are listed at Grade I, the highest of the three grades, and the others are at Grade II, the lowest grade.  The major building in the parish is Hoghton Tower; this and associated structures are listed.  Otherwise the parish in mainly rural, and a number of farmhouses and farm buildings are listed.  The other listed buildings consist of two churches, a former school, a war memorial, and a railway viaduct.

Key

Buildings

References

Citations

Sources

Lists of listed buildings in Lancashire
Buildings and structures in the Borough of Chorley